The 2014–15 season was Hibernian's first season of play in the second tier of Scottish football since 1999 and their first season in the Scottish Championship, having been relegated from the Scottish Premiership at the end of the previous season. Hibernian also competed in the Challenge Cup, League Cup, Scottish Cup and the Scottish Premiership play-offs.

Results & fixtures

Scottish Championship

Premiership play-offs

Challenge Cup

League Cup

Scottish Cup

Player statistics
During the 2014–15 season, Hibs have used thirty different players in competitive games. The table below shows the number of appearances and goals scored by each player.

a.  Includes other competitive competitions, including the play-offs and the Challenge Cup.

Disciplinary record

Club statistics

League table

Division summary

Management statistics
Last updated on 23 May 2015

Transfers

Players in

Players out

Loans in

Loans out

See also
List of Hibernian F.C. seasons

Notes

References

2014andndash;15
Hibernian